Reformed Church University  (RCU) was established in 2012 in Masvingo Zimbabwe.

References

External links 
 Reformed Church University  website

Universities and colleges in Zimbabwe
Educational institutions established in 2012
Reformed Church in Zimbabwe
2012 establishments in Zimbabwe
Buildings and structures in Masvingo Province
Christian universities and colleges
Education in Masvingo Province